Atlanta's Fourth Ward encompassed mainly what is now called the Old Fourth Ward.

1874

A new city charter increased the radius of the city from one to one and a half miles, reduced the number of wards back to five and created a bi-cameral council of two councilmen from each ward and a second body of three at-large aldermen was established.

The new Fourth ward layout was from Pryor and tracks east on Georgia RR to city limits then north west to West Peachtree and south to origin. Two councilmen would be elected from each ward each year.

In late 1875, an ordinance passed where each year one councilman would be elected from each ward for a two-year term. The first year, 1876 just had one citywide alderman and a single councilman from each ward and they would be fully staffed two years later.

1883

On November 5, 1883, a Sixth Ward (beige) was carved out of the Fourth and Fifth Wards. The Fourth lost the entire Peachtree St corridor leaving a district of working class citizens: Germans and Jews to the north and Blacks to the south. Before 1910, the ward had become almost exclusively Black centered on Sweet Auburn and a large portion of it was destroyed in the Great Atlanta fire of 1917.

See also
Atlanta ward system

References
 

Ward 1